Helio Matheus (July 5, 1940 – February 9, 2017) was a Brazilian singer and composer.

Matheus started his music career playing in nightclubs in Rio de Janeiro and São Paulo, first recording a single in 1968. His first successful composition was "", which was performed by Vanusa in the 1969 Festival Internacional da Canção and also recorded in 1970 by Elis Regina for her album . In 1975, he recorded his first LP Matheus Segundo Matheus. The record featured musicians like Oberdan Magalhães, Zé Rodrix, Chiquinho de Moraes, and the band Azymuth. After the release of the EP  in 1977, two songs off the record, "" and "," were featured in the soundtracks of Rede Globo telenovelas, O Astro and  respectively. He continued to compose for singers like Sérgio Reis, Dominguinhos, GIlliard, Franco Scornavacca, and Jair Rodrigues.

Throughout his career, Matheus composed more than 150 songs; "Mais Kriola", recorded by Wanderléa in 1973, "Camisa 10" in 1973 (in collaboration with guitarist Luis Vagner), "Alma Nua", recorded by Gilliard in 1988, "Garimpeiro Real," recorded by Dominguinhos in 1994, among others.

In his final years, Matheus suffered from alcoholism, spending most of this time living out of hostels. He later returned Rio de Janeiro and resided in the  until his death from pneumonia, in 2017.

Discography 
Albums

  (1975)
  (1996)

EPs

  (1977)

Singles

 "" (1968)
 "" (1971)
 "" (1973)
 "" (1974)
 "" (1978)

See also 
 Helio Matheus (Portuguese Wikipedia)

References 

1940 births
2017 deaths
20th-century Brazilian male singers
Brazilian composers
Brazilian guitarists
Brazilian singer-songwriters
Brazilian soul singers
People from Rio de Janeiro (city)
RCA Victor artists
Som Livre artists